Smythapark is the site of an Iron Age hill fort, situated close to the village of Bratton Fleming in Devon, England. The surrounding area is rich in small enclosures.

References

Hill forts in Devon